Orova Vas ( or) is a small village settlement in the Municipality of Polzela in eastern Slovenia. The area is part of the traditional region of Styria. As part of the Municipality of Polzela, it is now included in the Savinja Statistical Region.

References

External links

Orova Vas on Geopedia

Populated places in the Municipality of Polzela